George Lennox  was an Irish footballer who played as a defender for Dolphin and Shelbourne.

He also played for both Ireland and the League of Ireland XI.

External links

References

Republic of Ireland association footballers
Association football defenders
Republic of Ireland international footballers
Ireland (FAI) international footballers
League of Ireland players
League of Ireland XI players
Year of birth missing
Year of death missing
Dolphin F.C. players